Guilt may refer to:
Guilt (emotion), an emotion that occurs when a person feels that they have violated a moral standard
Culpability, a legal term
Guilt (law), a legal term

Music
Guilt (album), a 2009 album by Mims
"Guilt" (The Long Blondes song), 2008
"Guilt" (Nero song), 2011

Film, television and games 
 Guilt (1931 film), a 1931 film featuring James Carew
 Guilt (2005 film), a 2005 film featuring Margaret Travolta
 Guilt (American TV series), a 2016 American television series
 Guilt (British TV series), a 2019 British television series
 Guilt (Revenge), an episode of the TV series Revenge
 GUILT, or Gangliated Utrophin Immuno Latency Toxin, antagonistic parasites in the Trauma Center series

See also
Guilty (disambiguation)
Gilt (disambiguation)